Queen Danui (단의왕후, 端懿王后, 11 July 1686 – 8 March 1718), of the Cheongsong Sim clan, was the first wife and princess consort of Crown Prince Hwiso, the future Gyeongjong of Joseon. She died before her husband's ascension to the throne.

Biography
The future Queen Danui was born on 11 July 1686 from the Cheongsong Sim clan as the eldest child and daughter of Sim Ho and his wife, Lady Park of the Goryeong Park clan.  

Through her father, Lady Sim is the 4th great-grandniece of Queen Insun, the wife of King Myeongjong, and the 9th great-grandniece of Queen Soheon, the wife of King Sejong and daughter of Sim On. She is also the 5th great-grandniece of Yi Ryang, a descendant of Grand Prince Hyoryeong, the son of King Taejong and Queen Wongyeong. 

She was appointed as a Crown Princess (세자빈) when she married Crown Prince Yi Yun in 1696 at the age of 11.

She died on 8 March 1718, during the 44th year of Sukjong of Joseon's reign, two years before Crown Prince Yi Yun ascend the throne as Gyeongjong of Joseon. After Gyeongjong's sudden death, her younger brother Shim Yu-hyeon (심유현, 沈維賢) claimed that Gyeongjong was confined by Noron eunuchs and was then poisoned. 

She was later posthumously named Queen Danui (단의왕후,端懿王后); adding Gonghyojeongmok (공효정목, 恭孝定穆) to her posthumous title when her husband became king. Her tomb is located on Hyereung 197, Donggureung-ro, Guri-si, Gyeonggi-do.

Family
Father - Sim Ho, Internal Prince Cheongeun (심호 청은부원군, 沈浩 靑恩府院君) (1668 - 1704)
1)Grandfather - Sim Bong-Seo (심봉서, 沈鳳瑞) (1652 - 1699)
2)Great-grandfather - Sim Gwon (심권, 沈權) (1643 - 1697)
3) Great-great-grandfather - Sim Hui-se (심희세, 沈熙世) (1601 - 1645)
4)Great-great-great-grandfather - Sim Yeol (심열, 沈悅) (1569 - 1646)
5)Great-great-great-great-grandfather - Sim Chung-Gyeom (심충겸, 沈忠謙) (1545 - 1594); Queen Insun’s younger brother
6)Great-great-great-great-great-grandfather - Sim Kang (심강, 沈鋼) (1514 - 1567); Queen Insun’s father
7) Great-great-great-great-great-great grandfather - Sim Yeon-Won (심연원, 沈連源) (1491 - 1558)
7) Great-great-great-great-great-great-grandmother - Lady Kim of the Gyeongju Kim clan (정경부인 경주 김씨, 貞敬夫人 慶州 金氏) (1485 - 1564)
6) Great-great-great-great-great--grandmother - Internal Princess Consort Wansan of the Jeonju Yi clan (완산부부인 전주 이씨, 完山府夫人 全州 李氏) (1512 - 1559)
5) Great-great-great-great-grandmother - Lady Yi of the Jeonju Yi clan (증 정경부인 전주 이씨)
4)Great-great-great-grandmother - Lady Nam of the Uiryeong Nam clan (의령 남씨); Shim Yeol’s first wife 
1)Grandmother - Lady Yi of the Jeonju Yi clan (정경부인 전주 이씨, 貞敬夫人 全州 李氏) (1650 - 1676), daughter of Yi Seong-Rin (이성린, 李聖麟); Sim Bong-seo’s second wife
Mother - Internal Princess Consort Yeongwon of the Goryeong Park clan (영원부부인 고령 박씨, 靈原府夫人 高靈 朴氏) (1668 - 1735)
Grandfather - Park Bin (박빈, 安山郡守 朴鑌) (1629 - ?)
Grandmother - Lady Han of the Cheongju Han clan (증 숙부인 청주 한씨, 贈 淑夫人 淸州 韓氏); daughter of Han Jin (한진, 韓縝) (1607 - 1659)
 Siblings
 Younger sister - Lady Sim of the Cheongsong Sim clan (청송 심씨)
 Brother-in-law - Song Jing-Gye (송징계, 宋徵啓) (1690 - 1772), son of Song Gwang-Suk (송광속, 宋光涑)
 Younger brother - Sim Yu-Hyeon (심유현, 沈維賢) (? - 1728)
 Younger brother - Sim Jun-Hyeon (심준현, 沈駿賢)
Husband - Gyeongjong of Joseon (조선 경종) (20 November 1688 - 11 October 1724) — No issue. 
Father-in-law - Yi Sun, Sukjong of Joseon (조선 숙종) (7 October 1661 - 12 July 1720)
Mother-in-law - Jang Ok-jeong, Royal Noble Consort Hui of the Indong Jang clan (3 November 1659 - 9 November 1701) (희빈 장씨)
 Legal mother-in-law - Queen Inhyeon of Yeoheung Min clan (인현왕후 민씨) (15 May 1667 - 16 September 1701)
Legal mother-in-law - Queen Inwon of the Gyeongju Kim clan (인원왕후 김씨) (3 November 1687 - 13 May 1757)

In popular culture
Portrayed by Woo Hee-jin in the 1988 MBC TV series 500 Years of Joseon: Queen Inhyeon
Portrayed by Park Ji-mi in the 2003 KBS2 TV series Jang Hee Bin.

See also
Gyeongjong of Joseon
Queen Seonui

References

External links

1686 births
1718 deaths
Royal consorts of the Joseon dynasty
Korean queens consort
17th-century Korean people
17th-century Korean women
18th-century Korean people
18th-century Korean women